Year 1414 (MCDXIV) was a common year starting on Monday (link will display the full calendar) of the Julian calendar.

Events 
 January–December 
 January 7 – Michael Küchmeister von Sternberg becomes the 28th Grand Master of the Teutonic Order.
 May 28 – Khizr Khan (Timur's governor of Multan) takes the Delhi Sultanate from Daulat Khan Lodi, founding the Sayyid Dynasty.
 August 6 – Joanna II succeeds her brother Ladislaus, as Queen of Naples.
 November 16 – The Council of Constance begins in order to end the western schism.

 Date unknown 
 Ernest, Duke of Austria (head of the Leopoldian line of the House of Habsburg) is the last duke to be enthroned in the Duchy of Carinthia, according to the ancient Carantanian ritual of installing dukes at the Prince's Stone; he adopts the title of Archduke. 
 Alien priory cells are suppressed in England.
 The Tibetan lama Je Tsongkhapa, of the Gelug school of Buddhism, declines the offer of the Yongle Emperor of China to appear in the capital at Nanjing, although he sends his disciple Chosrje Shākya Yeshes, who is given the title "State Teacher". The later Xuande Emperor will grant Yeshes the title of a king, upon a return visit to China (to the new capital at Beijing).
 Durham School is founded as a grammar school in the city of Durham, England by Thomas Langley, Prince-Bishop of Durham; it continues in existence as an independent school 600 years later.

Births 
 January 7 – Henry II, Count of Nassau-Siegen, Co-ruler of Nassau-Siegen (1442–1451) (d. 1451)
 March 25 – Thomas Clifford, 8th Baron de Clifford, English noble (d. 1455)
 May 11 – Francis I, Duke of Brittany (d. 1450)
 July 21 – Pope Sixtus IV (d. 1484)
 November 7 – Jami, Persian poet (d. 1492)
 November 9 – Albrecht III Achilles, Elector of Brandenburg, Prince-elector of the Margraviate of Brandenburg (d. 1486)
 date unknown
 Charles I, Count of Nevers, Count of Nevers and Rethel (d. 1464)
 Tenshō Shūbun, Japanese painter in the Muromachi period and Zen Buddhist monk (d. 1463)
 probable – Narsinh Mehta, poet-saint of Gujarat (d. 1481)

Deaths 
 February 19 – Thomas Arundel, Archbishop of Canterbury (b. 1353)
 March 28 – Jeanne-Marie de Maille, French Roman Catholic saint (b. 1331) 
 August 6 – King Ladislaus of Naples (b. 1377)
 September 1 – William de Ros, 6th Baron de Ros, Lord Treasurer of England (b. 1369)
 date unknown
 Tewodros I, Emperor of Ethiopia
 Fairuzabadi, Persian lexicographer (b. 1329)
 Ali ibn Mohammed al-Jurjani, Persian encyclopaedic writer (b. 1339)
 John I Stanley of the Isle of Man, Lord Lieutenant of Ireland, King of the Isle of Man (b. 1350)
 probable – Zyndram of Maszkowice, Polish 14th- and 15th-century knight (b. 1355)

References